Joanna Barnes  (November 15, 1934 – April 29, 2022) was an American actress and writer.

Early life and education
Barnes was born in Boston, Massachusetts, the eldest daughter of John Pindar Barnes and Alice Weston Mutch. She had two younger sisters, Alice and Judith, with whom she grew up in the suburb of Hingham. Joanna Barnes attended Milton Academy and then Smith College, from which she graduated in 1956 as a member of Phi Beta Kappa. She majored in English. Barnes received the college's award for poetry, the immediate successor to Sylvia Plath for this recognition. Her research for a magazine article about making movies led to a career change to acting.

Career

Television
Barnes' initial appearance on television was in the episode "The Man Who Beat Lupo" on Ford Theatre. She made guest appearances on many television series, including the ABC/Warner Bros. programs 77 Sunset Strip and Maverick, CBS's  Have Gun - Will Travel, What's My Line (11/28/1965), and the crime drama Richard Diamond, Private Detective. In 1960–61, she guest-starred on The Untouchables episode "90 Proof Dame" as the wife of a French exporter of brandy.

Barnes appeared as Kate Henniger, with Bing Russell and Arthur Space in the 1958 episode "Ghost Town" of the ABC/WB Western series Colt .45, starring Wayde Preston. In 1959, she portrayed Lola in the NBC detective series 21 Beacon Street.

In the 1960s, Barnes worked for producer Martin Ransohoff and appeared in episodes of his The Beverly Hillbillies ("Elly Goes to School" and "The Clampett Look") and was billed as special guest-star. Barnes played Peter Falk's former wife on the 1965–1966 CBS series The Trials of O'Brien and was host of the ABC daytime talk show Dateline: Hollywood in 1967.

She was also a frequent panellist in the early years of the syndicated version of What's My Line?. On December 19, 1972, Barnes appeared on The Merv Griffin Show with Joan Fontaine, Zsa Zsa Gabor and Dan Martino (founder of the Dan Martino School for Men).

Film

Barnes moved to Los Angeles soon after finishing her education, and took up a contract with Columbia Pictures. She went on to have roles in more than 20 films. Among her most remembered roles is the snooty Gloria Upson in the film Auntie Mame (1958), which earned her a Golden Globe Award nomination for New Star of the Year. Barnes became the 13th actress to play Jane when she appeared in Tarzan, the Ape Man (1959), with Denny Miller as Tarzan. In Disney's original 1961 version of The Parent Trap starring Hayley Mills, Barnes played gold-digger Vicki Robinson, who temporarily comes between Maureen O'Hara and Brian Keith. In the 1998 remake starring Lindsay Lohan, she played Vicki Blake, the mother of the child-hating gold-digger and fiancée Meredith Blake (Elaine Hendrix). In 1967, she appeared in The War Wagon, a western movie starring John Wayne and Kirk Douglas.

Writing
Barnes was also a writer and columnist. In 1973, she told newspaper columnist Dick Kleiner that she liked writing because "it is something you do yourself. With acting, if you win an Oscar or an Emmy, you have to thank everybody. If you write a book, it is completely your own."

She wrote a book, Starting from Scratch, about home decorating and several novels, including The Deceivers (1970), Who Is Carla Hart? (1973), Pastora (1980), and Silverwood (1985). She wrote a weekly book review for the Los Angeles Times, and her column "Touching Home" was carried by The Chicago Tribune and the New York News Syndicate.

Death
Barnes died at her home in Sea Ranch, California, on April 29, 2022, aged 87. (Some sources erroneously gave her age at death as 89, although the 1940 U.S. census gives her age as of May 9, 1940 as 5 years.)

Select filmography

References

External links
 
 
 Speaking of Stories: Joanna Barnes bio
 Golden Globes: Auntie Mame 
 

1934 births
2022 deaths
American columnists
American women columnists
American women novelists
American film actresses
American television actresses
Milton Academy alumni
Smith College alumni
People from Hingham, Massachusetts
Actresses from Boston
Actresses from Los Angeles
20th-century American actresses
20th-century American novelists
Writers from Boston
Writers from Los Angeles
20th-century American women writers
Western (genre) television actors
Novelists from Massachusetts
American women non-fiction writers
20th-century American non-fiction writers
21st-century American women